Peter Brian Walker (born April 8, 1969) is an American former professional baseball relief pitcher and currently the pitching coach for the Toronto Blue Jays of Major League Baseball (MLB).

Playing career
Walker graduated from East Lyme High School in East Lyme, Connecticut, and from Charter Oak State College. He played college baseball at Connecticut and earned All-Tournament honors in the Huskies 1990 Big East Conference baseball tournament championship.

On March 17 , Walker was traded along with minor leaguer Scott Adair to the San Diego Padres for Roberto Petagine and minor leaguer Luis Arroyo. Walker played one game for the Padres before going to the minors. In 1997, Walker signed with the Boston Red Sox but never played for them at the major league level.

In , Walker made his way back to the major league level with the Colorado Rockies after signing with them in 1998. In December 2000, Walker once again signed with the New York Mets and played 3 games for them before returning to the minors.

On July 22, 2006, Walker had shoulder surgery. In 2006, the Toronto Blue Jays released him, but on February 12 , the Blue Jays signed him to a minor league contract with an invitation to spring training;  he was released toward the end of spring training 2007. He signed with the New York Yankees on May 9, 2007.

Scouting report
Walker threw an 87–88 MPH four-seam fastball, an 81–83 MPH slider, an 80–82 MPH circle changeup, as well as the occasional 81–83 MPH split-finger fastball, and 83–85 MPH cutter.

Post-playing career 
On November 7, 2011, Walker was named bullpen coach for the Toronto Blue Jays, following a stint as the pitching coach for the Double-A New Hampshire Fisher Cats, which won the Eastern League title earlier that year.

On November 24, 2012, Walker was appointed as the pitching coach for the Blue Jays, replacing Bruce Walton.

Personal life
On March 26, 2022, Walker was arrested in Pinellas County, Florida, and charged with driving under the influence.

References

External links

}

1969 births
Living people
American expatriate baseball players in Canada
American expatriate baseball players in Japan
Baseball coaches from Massachusetts
Baseball players from Massachusetts
Charter Oak State College alumni
Colorado Rockies players
Colorado Springs Sky Sox players
UConn Huskies baseball players
Gulf Coast Red Sox players
Gulf Coast Yankees players
Las Vegas Stars (baseball) players
Major League Baseball pitchers
Major League Baseball pitching coaches
New Haven Ravens players
New York Mets players
Norfolk Tides players
Pawtucket Red Sox players
St. Lucie Mets players
San Diego Padres players
Sportspeople from Beverly, Massachusetts
Toronto Blue Jays coaches
Toronto Blue Jays players
Trenton Thunder players
Syracuse SkyChiefs players
Yokohama BayStars players